Ronde van Drenthe is an elite men's and women's professional road bicycle racing event held annually in the Drenthe, Netherlands and sanctioned by the Royal Dutch Cycling Union. Since 1998 there is also a women's event, known as Novilon Internationale Damesronde van Drenthe and since 2007 there is also a Ronde van Drenthe for women which was part of the UCI Women's Road World Cup until 2015. In 2016, the race became part of the new UCI Women's World Tour.

Since 2005, the men's event is UCI 1.1 rated and is part of the UCI Europe Tour.

Route 
The race uses generally flat roads in the Drenthe region of the Netherlands, with the challenge being multiple ascents of the  – a hill built on a landfill site. The climb is 750m in length with an average gradient of 4.2% and a maximum gradient of 20%.

Men's past winners

Women's past winners

Novilon Damesronde van Drenthe 
In September 2015 it was announced that the race would not continue in 2016.
The name of the race had over the years different names
 2004–2007: Novilon Internationale Damesronde van Drenthe
 2008–2011: Novilon Eurocup Ronde van Drenthe
 2012: Novilon Euregio Cup
 2014–2015: Novilon EDR Cup

Drentse 8 van Dwingeloo / Acht van Westerveld

Ronde van Drenthe

References

External links 
  
 Cyclingwebsite.net list of men's winners
 Cyclingwebsite.net list of women's winners

 
Cycle races in the Netherlands
UCI Women's Road World Cup
UCI Europe Tour races
Recurring sporting events established in 1960
1960 establishments in the Netherlands
Recurring sporting events established in 1998
1998 establishments in the Netherlands
Women's road bicycle races
UCI Women's World Tour races